Sri Ramappa Balappa Bidari (3 September 1898 – 31 August 1982) was an Indian statesman who was the Prime Minister of the Princely State of Aundh (India), a small state consisting of 5 taluks with Aundh as its capital, between 1941 and 1947, and later served as a Member of Parliament (1952–1962).

Early years 
Ramappa Balappa Bidari was born on 3 September 1898 at Budhni-Meerji in Mudhol Princely State, the home town of his mother Kasibai. Ramappa's parents Konnappavar Balappa and Kasibai had two sons and three daughters. Balappa succumbed to plague when his youngest daughter was 13 days old. Kasibai settled down with her children in Bidari and oversaw the agricultural work in her lands with the support of her brothers and other relatives. Ramappa Balappa Bidari, the eldest son, helped his mother in farming and other household work from a young age. He also attended primary school in Bidari.

After passing 4th grade in Bidari, Ramappa chose to continue his studies up to matriculation in Jamkhandi. However, to go to Jamkhandi, he would have to cross River Krishna, which was in spate for four months in a year. The family had properties in the villages of Gunadala, Honaganahalli and Lohagaum. The family decided to shift the entire household from Bidari to Honganahalli, which was closer to Bijapura (now Vijayapura). Ramappa enrolled himself in the Government High School in Bijapura.

While in Bidari, he helped his mother in agriculture work, taking care of cattle alongside his studies and extracurricular activities. Ramappa carried forward his childhood interest in games throughout his high school days. After coming to Bijapura, he played hockey, volleyball, cricket, football,  etc. He secured the first rank in his matriculation (equivalent to today's SSLC).

Marriage and college education 
After his matriculation, Ramappa was married at 21 in 1919 to Chinnamma (Chinnabai), daughter of Sankanagouda Patil of Garasangi village of Basavana Bagewadi. After marriage, Ramappa Bidari enrolled in the reputed Fergusson College, Pune, for higher studies. Then the first year was termed F.Y. and the second year was called Inter, which was equivalent to the PUC today. He completed his Inter in his first attempt, which was a rare accomplishment in those days. After that, he enrolled in a two-year B.A. degree course, with Political Science and Economics as his subjects. He secured his B.A. degree in 1923.

Ramappa desired to study law after completing his B.A. degree. He had his mother's encouragement and blessings to do so. He enrolled in the Law College in Pune. He secured his degree in law in 1927 and returned to his village.

Ramappa Bidari married for the second time ten years after his first marriage. Tarabai, his second wife, was the sister of his first wife, Chinnabai. Tarabai delivered a baby boy on 25 May 1930. This child grew up to be Bijapur's eminent doctor - Dr. Chandrasekhar Bidari Ramappa. Tarabai gave birth to two more sons - Hanumantha and Laxmana and four daughters - Indrabai, Gangabai, Bhagirathi and Shakuntala in the following years.

Career 
Ramappa did not enjoy his work as a lawyer. He became involved in social service. He was influenced by freedom fervour and Mahatma Gandhi. He came in contact with Sugandhi Murigeppa, a well-known figure in Bijapura. From that day on, Ramappa became a dedicated member of the National Congress.

Being in contact with the people and the administration, he grew to be one of the prominent leaders of Bijapura. This led to his becoming the Secretary of Bijapura Taluka Co-operative Development Society in 1928. He became a member of the progressive Bijapura Zilla Sahakari Bank, established in the same district in 1919, and its Vice President in 1929. The British government held the well-educated and progressive Ramappa Bidari in high regard. Impressed by his activities, the British government appointed him as an Honorary First Grade Magistrate for the Zilla in July 1937. However, responding to the call for nationwide Satyagraha, he resigned from the Magistrate's position in November 1940.

Prime Minister of Aundh 
The Princely State of Aundh occupied 1298 sq km approximately and had a population of 88,762 (As per the 1941 census). It comprised 73 villages in five taluks. Of these, four taluks of Aundh, Atapadi, Karasundi, Kundala fall in today's Satara and Sangli districts of Maharashtra and Gundala in today's Bijapura (Vijayapura) district in Karnataka.

When Ramappa Bidari was the prime minister of Aundh, it was ruled by Maharajah Bhawanrao Shriniwasarao, also known as Bala Saheb. He ascended the throne on 4 November 1909. His stint as the Chief Secretary of his father had given him the much-needed experience to administer the State. Strongly influenced by Sri Lokamanya Tilak and Mahatma Gandhiji, in 1917, he began selecting people's representatives in all the villages under his rule and handing over authority to them. But this idea was not given a proper concrete shape.

Ramappa Bidari, who initially joined as a minister in the first council of ministers constituted after the first elections in Aundh, was promoted to the position of Prime Minister or Pant Pratinidhi of the State in 1941. Appa Pant, who held the position of the Prime Minister in the first council, became a minister. This highlights Ramappa's administrative capabilities.

Writing about Ramappa's attitude to work and his relationship with the Maharajah, Yuvarajah Appa Pant states - "Auditing the accounts of every village, he laid down a procedure for collection of appropriate taxes. He paved the way to increase productivity in the villages. He bravely and skilfully introduced a system to make good use of the taxes collected through the Panchayats."

As the Prime Minister of Aundh, Ramapapa Bidari realized Mahatma Gandhi's dream of Swarajya. He built schools, health centres, Samaja Mandirs, wells, lakes, and buildings in every village. He brought down the taxes on the farmers and increased the State's revenue by taxing the people without burdening them.

Recalling Ramappa Bidari's achievements, the Yuvarajah Appa Pant wrote, "The State of Aundh was indebted to certain wealthy men from whom it borrowed. Each year, Gangaram Chabildas lent Rs. 2-3 lakhs to the State of Aundh on the personal standing of the Maharajah. The debt was settled every February/March when the taxes were collected. In 1944, after 150 years, for the first time, the State did not borrow from Gangaram Chabildas. Ramappa Bidari was the first and last person to achieve this distinction."
Ramappa Bidari played a significant role first in forming the Union of Southern States and later in its merger with the Indian Union. In 1948, prominent people and representatives from all the States were invited to Delhi to discuss the future of the States. The State of Aundh played a principal role in these discussions. Aundh and Jamkhandi States were the first to agree to join the Indian Union. Aundh was merged with the Mumbai province, and the Kannada speaking Gunadala was merged with the Bijapura district.

Bijapura District Congress President 
Sri Sharanayya B Vastra, the Secretary of the Zilla Congress Samiti in 1952, states in his memoirs that Ramappa Bidari was elected as the President of the Bijapura Zilla Congress Samiti on 10 June 1952. The Secretary of AICC Sri Agarwal would often visit Bijapur Zilla Congress Committee during Ramappa Bidari's presidency. He expressed his happiness at the activities of the Samiti, the systematic and neat way of maintaining official documents.

Ramappa Bidari was the President of the Bijapura Zilla Congress Samiti twice: 1952-1957 and 1968-1972 for a total of nine years. He tried his best to strengthen the Congress party during his tenure.

Member of Parliament 
Ramappa Bidari was elected to the Lok Sabha twice and served as a member of Parliament for ten years. In 1952, he contested the first General Elections from the Bijapura (South) constituency of the undivided Bijapura district and won by a huge margin. He defeated Sri Munvali Vakil by a margin of more than 1,61,578 votes. It was the second-highest margin of win, in the country, for a candidate. Bijapura (South) constituency is now the Bagalkote Lok Sabha constituency. In 1957 also, he won the General Elections from the same constituency.

As a member of the Lok Sabha, he actively participated in the assembly sessions. When the Upper Krishna Project of building a dam at Almatti was proposed, he suggested measures to the government and the people affected by the backwaters. He suggested constructing an alternative bridge near Galgali, as the existing bridge near Kolhar would be submerged by this project. The bridge exists even to this day.

Honganahalli, a village in Bijapura Taluk, was his place of residence. The Sholapur-Gadag train passed through this village but would not halt there as there was no station. Ramappa Bidari's efforts helped in getting a station built at Honganahalli. He did not limit his welfare activities to Honaganahalli. Mudalagi village in Gokak Taluk got modern facilities like a post office, telephones, etc., due to his efforts. Ramappa Bidari actively participated in the discussions of the Lok Sabha. He gave relevant information for the development of the states and the nation and his suggestions on various issues.

Later days 
Ramappa Bidari, after two terms in the Lok Sabha, did not contest any more elections. Residing in his village Honaganahalli, he took care of his household and lands. Whenever time permitted, he involved himself in social development activities. He served as the Vice President of BLDEA, an educational organization, between 1972 and 1980.
In 1969, he met with an accident when he had gone to Ahmedabad to attend the All India Congress Conference. His body and hands were severely injured. In 1978, while cycling to a fair at Horatti to purchase bullocks, he met with an accident and broke his legs.

1n 1982, when he fell ill frequently, he was admitted to the Wadia Hospital in Sholapur. He passed away at the hospital at 9:30 a.m. on 31 August 1982. He was 84 years of age. His final rites were performed at Honaganahalli. A huge gathering attended his last ceremonies, which were conducted with full state honours.

Books on Ramappa Bidari 
Two biographies on Ramappa Bidari have been published - Prof. S. S. Baanad's Aparupada Rajakarani Ramappa Bidari and Dr. Krishna Kolharkulkarni's Ramappa Balappa Bidari - The Unsung Champion of Gram Swarajya

References 

 Aparupada Rajakarani Ramappa Bidari by Prof. S. S. Baanad 
 Ramappa Balappa Bidari - The Unsung Champion of Gram Swarajya by Dr. Krishna Kolharkulkarni
 'Member Bioprofile' - PARLIAMENT OF INDIA LOK SABHA - http://loksabhaph.nic.in/writereaddata/biodata_1_12/628.htm

External links

 Second Lok Sabha Members Bioprofile

1898 births
Karnataka politicians
India MPs 1952–1957
Lok Sabha members from Karnataka
People from Karnataka
India MPs 1957–1962
1982 deaths